Brandon McIlwain (born May 31, 1998) is an American professional baseball outfielder in the New York Mets organization. A multi-sport athlete, he played both college baseball and college football at the University of South Carolina and the University of California, Berkeley.

High school career
McIlwain attended Council Rock High School North in Newtown, Bucks County, Pennsylvania. He played both baseball and football in high school. During his high school football career, he had 10,157 yards (6,480 passing, 3,677 rushing) of total offense and 123 total touchdowns (56 passing, 67 rushing). McIlwain committed to the University of South Carolina to play college football and college baseball. He was also a top prospect for the 2016 Major League Baseball draft, but opted to attend college.

College career

Football
As a true freshman at South Carolina in 2016, McIlwain played in eight games and made three starts. He made his first career start against East Carolina University, throwing for 195 yards and rushing for 34 with two touchdowns. He finished the year with 600 passing yards with two passing touchdowns and one interception and 127 rushing yards with two touchdowns. McIlwain redshirted in 2017.

McIlwain transferred to the University of California, Berkley in 2017. After sitting out his first year due to transfer rules, he played in 10 games with two starts in 2018. For the season, he passed for 763 yards with two touchdowns and eight interceptions and added 403 rushing yards with four touchdowns. He left the football team in 2019 to focus on his baseball career.

Baseball
As a freshman baseball player in 2016, McIlwain played in eight games and had one hit in 10 at-bats. He played in only one game in 2017, before announcing his transfer to Cal. After not playing his first year due to transfer rules, McIlwain played in 20 games in 2019 and hit .258/.309/.436 with two home runs in 62 at-bats. He was drafted by the Miami Marlins in the 26th round of the 2019 MLB draft, but did not sign and returned to Cal. In his final season in 2020, McIlwain hit .200/.333/.273 with one home run over 55 at-bats in 16 games during the shortened season caused by the Covid-19 pandemic.

Professional career
McIlwain signed with the New York Mets as an undrafted free agent after the 2020 MLB draft. He made his professional debut in 2021 with the St. Lucie Mets. He played 2022 with the Brooklyn Cyclones and Binghamton Rumble Ponies. After the season, McIlwain played in the Arizona Fall League.

References

External links

1998 births
Living people
Baseball players from Pennsylvania
Players of American football from Pennsylvania
Baseball outfielders
American football quarterbacks
South Carolina Gamecocks football players
South Carolina Gamecocks baseball players
California Golden Bears football players
California Golden Bears baseball players
St. Lucie Mets players
Brooklyn Cyclones players
Binghamton Rumble Ponies players
Peoria Javelinas players